The 2012 Gracia–Orlová was the 26th edition of the Gracia–Orlová, a women's cycling stage race. It was an UCI 2.2 category race, and was held between 25 and 29 April 2012 in the Czech Republic and Poland.

Stages

Prologue
25 April 2012 – Havírov to Havírov (individual time trial),

Stage 1
26 April 2012 – Detmarovice to Štramberk,

Stage 2
27 April 2012 – Havírov to Havírov (individual time trial),

Stage 3
28 April 2012 – Lichnov to Lichnov,

Stage 4
29 April 2012 – Orlová to Orlová,

Final classifications

General classification

Source

Points classification

Source

Mountain classification

Source

Youth classification

Source

References

External links

2012 in women's road cycling
2012 in Czech sport
2012 in Polish sport
2012